This is a list of telephone area codes in the state of Nevada.

702: The southeastern tip of Nevada, including the Las Vegas metropolitan area

725: An overlay area code for the 702 area code effective June 2014.

775: All of Nevada outside the southeastern corner, including Reno and Carson City

Under the original North American Numbering Plan of 1947, area code 702 covered all of Nevada.  Area code 775 split off in 1998.

See also

External links

Nevada
Area codes